The Mill Run Wind Energy Center is a wind farm located in Fayette County, Pennsylvania with ten 1.5 MW Enron Wind TZs that began commercial operation in November 2001. The wind farm has a combined total nameplate capacity of 15 MW, but actually produces about 39,420 megawatt-hours of electricity annually. The wind farm was developed by Atlantic Renewable Energy and Horizon Wind Energy, and constructed and operated by NextEra Energy Resources, based in Florida.

See also

Wind power in Pennsylvania

References

External links
 Mill Run Wind Power Project, Horizon Wind Energy

Energy infrastructure completed in 2001
Wind farms in Pennsylvania
Buildings and structures in Fayette County, Pennsylvania
NextEra Energy